M. K. B. v. Warden, 540 U.S. 804 (2003), 540 U.S. 1213 (2004), is a sealed case in South Florida.

M.K.B. are the initials of Mohamed Kamel Bellahouel, an immigrant Algerian waiter who was interviewed by federal officials. He has reportedly been freed on a $10,000 bond.  The only information about the case was inadvertently released and reported by The Christian Science Monitor. In 2004, the United States Supreme Court notably sided with the government's request to grant the case total secrecy.

References

External links 
 "Supreme Court asks for more input on secret September 11 case"
 "Secret 9/11 case before high court"
 "Supreme Court decision may limit access to terror cases"
 "MKB v. Warden. Was is it?"

United States Supreme Court cases
United States habeas corpus case law
Algeria–United States relations
United States Supreme Court cases of the Rehnquist Court